Kurosegawa Kuniyuki  (born 13 May 1951 as Kensaku Sakai) is a former sumo wrestler from Higashimurayama, Tokyo, Japan. He made his professional debut in January 1966, and reached the top division in May 1978. His highest rank was komusubi. He retired in May 1984 and became an elder in the Japan Sumo Association under the name Kiriyama. In 1995 he branched out from Isegahama stable and established his own Kiriyama stable, which shut down in 2011. He reached the mandatory retirement age of 65 in May 2016, but was re-hired by the Sumo Association for five years as a consultant. In September 2016 he was re-appointed as a judge of tournament bouts, following the demotion of Kasugayama. He left the Sumo Association upon turning 70 in May 2021.

Career record

See also
Glossary of sumo terms
List of past sumo wrestlers
List of sumo elders
List of sumo tournament second division champions
List of komusubi

References

1951 births
Living people
Japanese sumo wrestlers
Sumo people from Tokyo
Komusubi